The Stanley Baxter Series  is a British comedy television show which was originally broadcast on the ITV in 1981. It was Baxter's first weekly sketch show for nine years since the first series of his The Stanley Baxter Picture Show, as he had concentrated on producing one-off specials since then. Baxter was nominated for the British Academy Television Award for Best Entertainment Performance losing out to Nigel Hawthorne for Yes Minister.

References

Bibliography
 Barfe, Louis. Turned Out Nice Again: The Story of British Light Entertainment. Atlantic Books, 2013.
 Vahimagi, Tise . British Television: An Illustrated Guide. Oxford University Press, 1996.

External links
 The Stanley Baxter Series at the British Comedy Guide

1981 British television series debuts
1981 British television series endings
1980s British comedy television series
ITV sketch shows
English-language television shows
1980s British television sketch shows
London Weekend Television shows